This is a list of seasons of Swedish ice hockey club Södertälje SK.

References

Sod